Bhagawanpur may refer to several places:
 In Nepal:
 Bhagawanpur, Lumbini
 Bhagawanpur, Sagarmatha
 In India:
 Bhagawanpur, Varanasi
 Bhagawanpur, West Bengal - in Purba Medinipur district